The 1965 Tasmanian Australian National Football League (TANFL) premiership season was an Australian Rules football competition staged in Hobart, Tasmania over nineteen (19) roster rounds and four (4) finals series matches between 3 April and 18 September 1965.

Participating Clubs
Clarence District Football Club
Glenorchy District Football Club
Hobart Football Club
New Norfolk District Football Club
North Hobart Football Club
Sandy Bay Football Club

1965 TANFL Club Coaches
Geoff Frier (Clarence)
Bobby Parsons (Glenorchy)
Mal Pascoe (Hobart)
Trevor Leo (New Norfolk)
Dick Grimmond (North Hobart)
Rex Geard (Sandy Bay)

TANFL Reserves Grand Final
Sandy Bay 15.16 (106) v New Norfolk 10.12 (72) – North Hobart Oval

TANFL Under-19's Grand Final
(Saturday, 25 September 1965)
New Norfolk 11.16 (82) v Glenorchy 6.9 (45) – North Hobart Oval

State Grand Final
(Saturday, 25 September 1965)
Glenorchy: 0.7 (7) | 8.10 (58) | 10.13 (73) | 11.16 (82)
 Scottsdale: 1.4 (10) | 4.7 (31) | 7.8 (50) | 9.8 (62)
Attendance: 13,762 at North Hobart Oval
Note: Glenorchy (TANFL guernsey) and Scottsdale (NTFA guernsey) wore alternate strips due to a guernseys clash.

Intrastate Matches
Jubilee Shield (Saturday, 1 May 1965)
TANFL 18.10 (118) v NWFU 14.19 (103) – Att: 10,000 at West Park Oval

Jubilee Shield (Saturday, 5 June 1965)
TANFL 14.20 (104) v NTFA 11.12 (78) – Att: 12,159 at North Hobart Oval

Inter-Association Match (Saturday, 26 June 1965)
TANFL 13.14 (92) v Huon FA 12.12 (84) – Att: 12,356 at North Hobart Oval (Interstate Curtain-Raiser)

Interstate Match
Interstate Match (Saturday, 26 June 1965)
South Australia 14.24 (108) v Tasmania 16.6 (102) – Att: 12,356 at North Hobart Oval

Interstate Matches (Sunday, 18 July 1965)
Victorian FA 12.11 (83) v Tasmania 11.10 (76) – Att: 10,000 at Toorak Park, Melbourne.

Leading Goalkickers: TANFL
Peter Hudson (New Norfolk) – 110

Medal Winners
Burnie Payne (Hobart) – William Leitch Medal
Ken Latham (New Norfolk) – George Watt Medal (Reserves)
Royce Hart (Clarence) – V.A Geard Medal (Under-19's)
Max McMahon (Glenorchy) & Danny Jones (Sandy Bay) – Weller Arnold Medal (Best player/s in Intrastate matches)

1965 TANFL Ladder

Round 1
(Saturday, 3 April 1965)
Nth Hobart 7.16 (58) v Glenorchy 7.16 (58) – Att: 5,729 at North Hobart Oval
Hobart 13.16 (94) v Clarence 8.11 (59) – Att: 4,204 at TCA Ground
New Norfolk 15.11 (101) v Sandy Bay 13.9 (87) – Att: 4,390 at Queenborough Oval

Round 2
(Saturday, 10 April 1965)
Clarence 9.19 (73) v Sandy Bay 7.12 (54) – Att: 5,691 at North Hobart Oval
Glenorchy 10.12 (72) v Hobart 9.13 (67) – Att: 4,042 at KGV Park
Nth Hobart 7.10 (52) v New Norfolk 7.7 (49) – Att: 3,791 at Boyer Oval

Round 3
(Saturday, 17 April & Monday, 19 April 1965)
Hobart 8.17 (65) v New Norfolk 9.7 (61) – Att: 5,164 at North Hobart Oval
Glenorchy 6.15 (51) v Clarence 3.7 (25) – Att: 3,732 at Bellerive Oval
Sandy Bay 7.10 (52) v Nth Hobart 4.12 (36) – Att: 7,976 at North Hobart Oval (Monday)

Round 4
(Saturday, 24 April 1965)
Glenorchy 13.16 (94) v New Norfolk 12.6 (78) – Att: 5,835 at North Hobart Oval
Hobart 14.18 (102) v Sandy Bay 11.11 (77) – Att: 3,865 at TCA Ground
Clarence 15.12 (102) v Nth Hobart 11.9 (75) – Att: 3,323 at Bellerive Oval

Round 5
(Saturday, 1 May 1965)
Nth Hobart 15.18 (108) v Hobart 10.10 (70) – Att: 4,295 at North Hobart Oval
Glenorchy 13.14 (92) v Sandy Bay 10.8 (68) – Att: 3,848 at Queenborough Oval
Clarence 8.11 (59) v New Norfolk 6.8 (44) – Att: 3,038 at Boyer Oval

Round 6
(Saturday, 8 May 1965)
Hobart 11.17 (83) v Clarence 7.13 (55) – Att: 4,283 at North Hobart Oval
Glenorchy 13.11 (89) v Nth Hobart 9.9 (63) – Att: 3,849 at KGV Park
New Norfolk 13.10 (88) v Sandy Bay 8.14 (62) – Att: 2,465 at Boyer Oval

Round 7
(Saturday, 15 May 1965)
Nth Hobart 15.15 (105) v New Norfolk 14.5 (89) – Att: 4,637 at North Hobart Oval
Hobart 15.17 (107) v Glenorchy 12.12 (84) – Att: 4,809 at TCA Ground
Sandy Bay 15.18 (108) v Clarence 12.11 (83) – Att: 3,431 at Bellerive Oval

Round 8
(Saturday, 22 May 1965)
Glenorchy 9.18 (72) v Clarence 9.10 (64) – Att: 4,838 at North Hobart Oval
Nth Hobart 18.6 (114) v Sandy Bay 8.11 (59) – Att: 3,403 at Queenborough Oval
New Norfolk 11.8 (74) v Hobart 7.8 (50) – Att: 2,674 at Boyer Oval

Round 9
(Saturday, 29 May 1965)
Clarence 15.11 (101) v Nth Hobart 9.13 (67) – Att: 5,120 at North Hobart Oval
Glenorchy 11.12 (78) v New Norfolk 9.13 (67) – Att: 5,374 at KGV Park
Sandy Bay 13.17 (95) v Hobart 11.5 (71) – Att: 3,468 at Queenborough Oval

Round 10
(Saturday, 12 June & Monday, 14 June 1965)
Glenorchy 10.11 (71) v Sandy Bay 10.9 (69) – Att: 6,717 at North Hobart Oval
Nth Hobart 13.12 (90) v Hobart 7.16 (58) – Att: 3,110 at TCA Ground
New Norfolk 15.12 (102) v Clarence 12.18 (90) – Att: 7,981 at North Hobart Oval (Monday)

Round 11
(Saturday, 19 June 1965)
New Norfolk 12.21 (93) v Sandy Bay 10.7 (67) – Att: 5,286 at North Hobart Oval
Glenorchy 5.9 (39) v Nth Hobart 2.12 (24) – Att: 3,988 at KGV Park
Hobart 8.17 (65) v Clarence 7.11 (53) – Att: 2,699 at Bellerive Oval

Round 12
(Saturday, 3 July 1965)
Hobart 13.14 (92) v Glenorchy 10.19 (79) – Att: 5,162 at North Hobart Oval
Clarence 14.11 (95) v Sandy Bay 12.12 (84) – Att: 3,465 at Queenborough Oval
New Norfolk 14.12 (96) v Nth Hobart 8.12 (60) – Att: 2,906 at Boyer Oval

Round 13
(Saturday, 10 July 1965)
Nth Hobart 14.16 (100) v Sandy Bay 14.15 (99) – Att: 3,913 at North Hobart Oval
New Norfolk 16.13 (109) v Hobart 13.17 (95) – Att: 3,522 at TCA Ground
Glenorchy 12.17 (89) v Clarence 10.4 (64) – Att: 3,901 at KGV Park

Round 14
(Saturday, 17 July 1965)
Hobart 10.18 (78) v Sandy Bay 11.11 (77) – Att: 3,862 at North Hobart Oval
Nth Hobart 18.13 (121) v Clarence 13.5 (83) – Att: 2,417 at Bellerive Oval
New Norfolk 13.9 (87) v Glenorchy 6.9 (45) – Att: 2,944 at Boyer Oval

Round 15
(Saturday, 24 July 1965)
Hobart 14.16 (100) v Nth Hobart 7.12 (54) – Att: 4,897 at North Hobart Oval
Sandy Bay 10.12 (72) v Glenorchy 9.16 (70) – Att: 2,884 at Queenborough Oval
New Norfolk 8.11 (59) v Clarence 5.19 (49) – Att: 3,023 at Bellerive Oval

Round 16
(Saturday, 31 July 1965)
Glenorchy 10.10 (70) v Nth Hobart 8.13 (61) – Att: 4,771 at North Hobart Oval
Clarence 15.15 (105) v Hobart 13.11 (89) – Att: 2,752 at TCA Ground
New Norfolk 14.19 (103) v Sandy Bay 9.14 (68) – Att: 3,625 at Queenborough Oval

Round 17
(Saturday, 7 August 1965)
Nth Hobart 12.7 (79) v New Norfolk 9.10 (64) – Att: 4,509 at North Hobart Oval
Glenorchy 9.7 (61) v Hobart 6.12 (48) – Att: 3,874 at KGV Park
Clarence 16.12 (108) v Sandy Bay 7.18 (60) – Att: 2,147 at Bellerive Oval

Round 18
(Saturday, 14 August 1965)
Clarence 19.8 (122) v Glenorchy 10.15 (75) – Att: 5,786 at North Hobart Oval
Nth Hobart 13.23 (101) v Sandy Bay 10.12 (72) – Att: 2,489 at Queenborough Oval
New Norfolk 20.12 (132) v Hobart 7.12 (54) – Att: 3,239 at Boyer Oval

Round 19
(Saturday, 21 August 1965)
Nth Hobart 10.14 (74) v Clarence 10.13 (73) – Att: 6,073 at North Hobart Oval
Hobart 18.27 (135) v Sandy Bay 16.11 (107) – Att: 2,440 at TCA Ground
New Norfolk 15.10 (100) v Glenorchy 9.7 (61) – Att: 3,475 at Boyer Oval *
Note: Peter Hudson (New Norfolk) kicks his 100th goal for the season.

First Semi Final
(Saturday, 28 August 1965)
Nth Hobart: 4.5 (29) | 6.7 (43) | 9.13 (67) | 11.14 (80)
Hobart: 3.4 (22) | 6.5 (41) | 9.8 (62) | 10.12 (72)
Attendance: 11,085 at North Hobart Oval

Second Semi Final
(Saturday, 4 September 1965)
Glenorchy: 5.6 (36) | 6.13 (49) | 8.18 (66) | 10.20 (80)
New Norfolk: 1.2 (8) | 1.12 (18) | 2.14 (26) | 5.16 (46)
Attendance: 14,438 at North Hobart Oval

Preliminary Final
(Saturday, 11 September 1965)
Nth Hobart: 3.2 (20) | 5.6 (36) | 9.8 (62) | 15.8 (98)
New Norfolk: 6.4 (40) | 11.4 (70) | 12.7 (79) | 15.7 (97)
Attendance: 13,730 at North Hobart Oval

Grand Final
(Saturday, 18 September 1965)
Glenorchy: 3.3 (21) | 5.7 (37) | 6.8 (44) | 10.15 (75)
Nth Hobart: 4.1 (25) | 5.1 (31) | 5.8 (38) | 6.8 (44)
Attendance: 18,548 at North Hobart Oval

Source: All scores and statistics courtesy of the Hobart Mercury and Saturday Evening Mercury (SEM) publications.

Tasmanian Football League seasons